Father Murphy is an American western drama television series that aired on the NBC network from  November 3, 1981, to September 18, 1983. Michael Landon created the series, was the executive producer, and directed the show in partnership with William F. Claxton, Maury Dexter, Victor French and Leo Penn.

Synopsis
The series stars former NFL Los Angeles Rams defensive tackle football player and Little House on the Prairie actor Merlin Olsen as an 1870s frontiersman named John Michael Murphy who teams up with prospector Moses Gage (Moses Gunn) to shelter a group of orphans who are being threatened with internment in a workhouse. Murphy disguises himself as a priest and befriends a schoolmarm to help the children find a home.

At the end of the first season, John's true identity is revealed to the head of the workhouse, and the orphans seem destined for a life of labor.  Instead, Murphy marries the schoolmarm and they get custody of the children.

Production
Many of the episodes were filmed at the Old Tucson Studios and theme park just outside Tucson, Arizona. The main village featured in the show was located at Big Sky Movie Ranch in Simi Valley, California; this was also the filming location for the television series Little House on the Prairie. The village was located approximately  uphill from the Ingalls' farm set.

Father Murphy is an NBC production and is syndicated outside of the U.S. by MGM Worldwide Television. However, MGM does not own the video rights.

Cast

Notable guest appearances on the series include: Shannen Doherty, Mykelti Williamson, Kellie Martin, John M. Pickard, Eddie Quillan, Christina Applegate, Amanda Peterson, Donna Wilkes, Tina Yothers, Mary Beth Evans, Wilfrid Hyde-White, Jerry Hardin, James Cromwell and Christopher Stone.

Episodes

Series overview

Season 1 (1981–82)

Season 2 (1982–83)

Home media
Image Entertainment (under license from NBC Studios) released both seasons of Father Murphy on DVD in Region 1 in 2004/2005.

References

External links

 

1981 American television series debuts
1983 American television series endings
1980s American drama television series
NBC original programming
1980s Western (genre) television series
Period family drama television series
Television series by Universal Television
English-language television shows
Catholic drama television series
Television shows set in Kansas
Television series set in the 1870s